ATP-binding cassette sub-family D member 2 is a membrane pump/transporter protein that in humans is encoded by the ABCD2 gene.

Function 

The protein encoded by this gene is a member of the superfamily of ATP-binding cassette (ABC) transporters. ABC proteins transport various molecules across extra- and intra-cellular membranes. ABC genes are divided into seven distinct subfamilies (ABC1, MDR/TAP, MRP, ALD, OABP, GCN20, White). This protein is a member of the ALD subfamily, which is involved in peroxisomal import of fatty acids and/or fatty acyl-CoAs in the organelle. All known peroxisomal ABC transporters are half transporters which require a partner half transporter molecule to form a functional homodimeric or heterodimeric transporter. The function of this peroxisomal membrane protein is unknown; however this protein is speculated to function as a dimerization partner of ABCD1 and/or other peroxisomal ABC transporters.

Clinical significance 

Mutations in this gene have been observed in patients with adrenoleukodystrophy, a severe demyelinating disease. This gene has been identified as a candidate for a modifier gene, accounting for the extreme variation among adrenoleukodystrophy phenotypes. This gene is also a candidate for a complement group of Zellweger syndrome, a genetically heterogeneous disorder of peroxisomal biogenesis.

See also 
 ATP-binding cassette transporter

Interactions 

ABCD2 has been shown to interact with PEX19.

References

Further reading

External links 
 
 

ATP-binding cassette transporters